
Gmina Pińczów is an urban-rural gmina (administrative district) in Pińczów County, Świętokrzyskie Voivodeship, in south-central Poland.

The gmina contains part of the protected areas called Kozubów Landscape Park, Nida Landscape Park and Szaniec Landscape Park.

Villages
Apart from the town of Pińczów, Gmina Pińczów contains the villages and settlements of Aleksandrów, Bogucice Drugie, Bogucice Pierwsze, Borków, Brzeście, Bugaj, Byczów, Chrabków, Chruścice, Chwałowice, Gacki, Grochowiska, Kopernia, Kowala, Kozubów, Krzyżanowice Dolne, Krzyżanowice Średnie, Leszcze, Marzęcin, Młodzawy Duże, Młodzawy Małe, Mozgawa, Nowa Zagość, Orkanów, Pasturka, Podłęże, Sadek, Skowronno Dolne, Skowronno Górne, Skrzypiów, Stara Zagość, Szarbków, Szczypiec, Uników, Winiary, Włochy, Wola Zagojska Dolna, Wola Zagojska Górna, Zagórzyce, Zakrzów and Zawarża.

Neighbouring gminas
Gmina Pińczów is bordered by the gminas of Busko-Zdrój, Chmielnik, Czarnocin, Działoszyce, Imielno, Kije, Michałów, Wiślica and Złota.

References
Polish official population figures 2006

Pinczow
Pińczów County